Afghanistan–Yugoslavia relations were historical foreign relations between Afghanistan and now split-up Socialist Federal Republic of Yugoslavia. Both countries were founding member states of the Non-Aligned Movement. Prime Minister of Afghanistan Mohammed Daoud Khan represented the Kingdom of Afghanistan at the 1961 First Conference of Heads of State or Government of the Non-Aligned Movement in Belgrade.

History

Soviet intervention in Afghanistan
Yugoslav diplomacy was highly alarmed by the 1979 Soviet intervention in Afghanistan, which similarly to Yugoslavia was at the time a non-aligned and socialist country outside of the Warsaw Pact. Yugoslavia officially condemned Soviet intervention and expressed "astonishment" and "deep concern" about developments in Afghanistan. The intervention happened when President of Yugoslavia Josip Broz Tito health situation deteriorated with perception that Moscow is waiting for Tito to die in order to renew its pressure on Belgrade. The funeral of Josip Broz Tito turned into the largest state funeral in history. Yugoslavia insisted that the Non-Aligned Movement organize a special ministerial meeting where Soviet intervention would be condemned, kind of action which until then was always reserved for Western countries. India was not ready to support the Yugoslav initiative fearing it will strengthened position of Pakistan and China, while Cuba, the chair of the Movement at the time, was in fact closely aligned with Soviet Union. Following the intervention Yugoslavia limited its diplomatic presence in Afghanistan to a level of the chargé d'affaires.

See also
Yugoslavia and the Non-Aligned Movement
Zahir Tanin
1973 Non-Aligned Standing Committee Conference
Afghanistan conflict (1978–present)
Yugoslav Wars
Death and state funeral of Josip Broz Tito
People's Democratic Party of Afghanistan
Khalq
Parcham
League of Communists of Yugoslavia
Tito–Stalin split
Titoism
Workers' self-management
Yugoslav Muslims
Islam in Bosnia and Herzegovina, Kosovo, North Macedonia, Serbia, Croatia, Montenegro and Slovenia
Christianity in Afghanistan
Kaymak

References

Afghanistan–Yugoslavia relations
Yugoslavia
Afghanistan